Willowick is a city in Lake County, Ohio, United States. The population was 14,171 at the 2010 census. A suburb of Cleveland, Willowick is served by a branch of the Willoughby-Eastlake Public Library. The city's name is a portmanteau of two adjacent cities in Lake County: Willoughby and Wickliffe. As of 2022, the mayor of Willowick is Michael Vanni.

Geography
Willowick is located at  (41.635080, -81.468290).

Demographics

94% spoke English, 1.9% Croatian, 1.0% Slovene, and 1.0% Spanish.

2010 census
As of the census of 2010, there were 14,171 people, 6,110 households, and 3,859 families residing in the city. The racial makeup of the city was 95.0% White, 2.5% African American, 0.1% Native American, 0.8% Asian, 0.2% from other races, and 1.3% from two or more races. Hispanic or Latino of any race were 1.3% of the population.

There were 6,110 households, of which 27.5% had children under the age of 18 living with them, 45.0% were married couples living together, 13.0% had a female householder with no husband present, 5.2% had a male householder with no wife present, and 36.8% were non-families. 31.2% of all households were made up of individuals, and 14.2% had someone living alone who was 65 years of age or older. The average household size was 2.32 and the average family size was 2.91.

The median age in the city was 41.5 years. 20.9% of residents were under the age of 18; 7.4% were between the ages of 18 and 24; 26.5% were from 25 to 44; 26.2% were from 45 to 64; and 19.1% were 65 years of age or older. The gender makeup of the city was 48.4% male and 51.6% female.

2000 census
As of the census of 2000, there were 14,361 people, 6,101 households, and 4,112 families residing in the city. The population density was 5,709.2 people per square mile (2,200.3/km). There were 6,272 housing units at an average density of 2,493.4 per square mile (961.0/km). The racial makeup of the city was 97.85% White, 0.75% African American, 0.05% Native American, 0.61% Asian, 0.03% from other races, and 0.71% from two or more races. Hispanic or Latino of any race were 0.71% of the population. 18.7% were of Italian, 16.0% German, 12.5% Irish, 9.3% Polish and 7.9% Slovene ancestry according to Census 2000.

There were 6,101 households. 25.4% of the households had children under the age of 18 living with them, 52.5% were married couples living together, 11.1% had a female householder with no husband present, and 32.6% were non-families. 28.3% of all households were made up of individuals non-familial related, and 14.2% had someone living alone who was 65 years of age or older. The average household size was 2.35 and the average family size was 2.90.

The city's age population was spread out, with 21.2% under the age of 18, 6.3% aged 18 to 24, 29.4% aged 25 to 44, 21.2% aged 45 to 64, and 21.9% who were 65 years of age or older. The median age was 41 years. For every 100 females, there were 91.8 males. For every 100 females aged 18 and over, there were 87.2 males.

The median income per household in the city was $44,107 and the median income for a family was $52,675. Males had a median income of $38,966 versus $27,297 for females. The per capita income for the city was $22,053. About 3.2% of families and 4.5% of the population were below the poverty line, including 6.6% of those under age 18 and 4.9% of those age 65 or over.

Education
Public education in the city is administered by Willoughby-Eastlake City School District. Public schools located with the city of Willowick are Royalview Elementary School and Willowick Middle School, both of which occupy the same campus.

Willowick has a public library, a branch of Willoughby-Eastlake Public Library.

Notable people
Tom Bukovac, session musician
Bob Golic, WNIR radio host, NFL player, actor
Mike Golic, football player and radio host
Robert Manry, sailed across the Atlantic Ocean in the Tinkerbelle

References

External links
 
 Willoughby-Eastlake Public Library
 Willowick History Project
 The History of  Willowick, Ohio as Compiled by Gale Lippucci

Cities in Lake County, Ohio
Populated places established in 1804
Cleveland metropolitan area
Cities in Ohio
Ohio populated places on Lake Erie